Park Sam-gyu (born 6 February 1932) is a South Korean former sports shooter. He competed in the trap event at the 1964 Summer Olympics.

References

External links
 

1932 births
Possibly living people
South Korean male sport shooters
Olympic shooters of South Korea
Shooters at the 1964 Summer Olympics
Place of birth missing (living people)